Joan Maria Thomàs Andreu (born 1953 in Palma) is a Spanish historian. He is professor of Contemporary History at the Rovira i Virgili University and corresponding member of the Royal Academy of History. His academic production has focused on the history of falangism and the international relations of Spain during the Francoist dictatorship.

Works

References 
Informational notes

Citations

Bibliography
 
 
 
 
 
 
 

 
Living people
1953 births
Historians of fascism
Academics and writers on the international relations of Spain
Historians of Francoist Spain